Scopula pallidiceps is a moth of the  family Geometridae. It is found on Lombok, Bali, Java and possibly Borneo.

References

Moths described in 1898
pallidiceps
Moths of Asia